is a manga series written and illustrated by Tenkla, published in Akita Shoten's Champion Red Ichigo and later Champion Red since October 2007 to August 2011.

Plot
Saku had a normal life, living with his cousin, Kuran and being nagged daily by his childhood friend, Karin. That is, until the day a girl named Kiiro showed up out of nowhere claiming to be Karin's and Saku's daughter from the future. Convinced she will disappear from existence unless Saku and Karin get married, she makes life a lot more complicated for everyone. Things only get crazier when Hiiro, a girl claiming to be Kuran's and Saku's daughter from a different timeline in the future, appears with the goal of getting Saku together with his cousin Kuran. Saku is suddenly faced with a dilemma: whom does he choose as his wife, and which daughter does he save from disappearing into nothing?

Media

Drama CD
A Drama CD was released with the September 2010 issue of Champion RED and features 3 chapters (separated in 4 acts).

Characters
Saku Sakuraga
 is the main character of the story and is popular among the girls at school. After the incident of his future daughters coming to the present and presenting him with wife candidates, he has difficulty choosing a partner. This is the reason why the daughters always use force to make their parents come together, although Saku is always reluctant to lose his virginity and is constantly trying to run away. It is shown that despite being very indecisive, he is actually very perverted, although this may be due to the constant antics of his daughters. However it is shown that he was less perverted in the past, albeit in a much more childish sense.
Karin
 is Saku's childhood-friend who is bossy and always bullying him around. She is possibly the only normal character in the entire series, despite often being pushed along into the weird antics. She had difficulty coming to terms with her feelings toward Saku, however she managed to finally face it in later chapters. She is a wife candidate for her daughter Kiiro. She has orange hair.
Kuran
 is Saku's cousin who started to live with him in his apartment. She initially confesses to Saku and proposes marriage, which Saku immediately turns down. However this will not stop her since she's a wife candidate for her daughter Hiiro, who gave her the courage she needs. She is womanly, has big breasts, is a good cook, and often spoils Saku. It is shown that Saku played perverted games with her in the past. She has dark blue hair.
Mebuki Kozue
 is Saku and Karin's class representative. Instead of being called , students from their class call her  because of her size. She is very self-conscious about her stature and breast size. When she is too turned on she goes into an ero-mode. Despite this, she hates having indecent things going on in "her" world when she is "normal". She is a wife candidate for her daughter Moegi. She has pink hair.
Rosemarie
 is a German exorcist. Unlike the other candidates, she is an older woman who appears to have no shame in seducing a young boy because higher-ups ordered her to do so. She cares a lot about her "future" daughter Cerulea and hates to be thought of as middle-aged. She is a wife candidate for her daughter Cerulea. She has blonde hair. She first appears in Chapter 21.
Kiiro
 is the daughter of Saku and Karin who comes from the future to make sure that she is born. She is airheaded and ditzy and is fond of curry. It is shown that her in her future that she is rich although initially being poor. Her father in the future is portrayed a rich and arrogant man who pushes his daughter to do well. Her name means yellow.
Hiiro
 is the daughter of Saku and Kuran. Hiiro is about the same age as Kiiro and also her rival. She is usually expressionless and seems to speak in a monotone. It is shown in her future that her family is poor because her father is an alcoholic and a vicious gambler filled with debts who constantly abandons his family to gamble some more. Her name means red.
Moegi
 is the daughter of Saku and Mebuki. She is the only one of the daughters in her teenage years, and often acts rude and will stop at nothing to make her future parents mate. She is arrogant and shameless unlike her mother and often misses out in main roles throughout the story, much to her frustration. It is shown in her future that her family is poor because her father is an alcoholic. She is even willing to commit incest with her father to get him to sleep with her mother (Kiiro tried this in her first appearance, but she did this out of simple naïvety), even going as far as asking him to have a threesome with her and her mother. As of chapter 9 there is evidence that she may have developed a father-complex for Saku during her stay in the present. Her name means green.
Cerulea
 is the daughter of Saku and Rosemarie. She came from the future to castrate her father so she will not be born in the future. This is because of the downfall of her mother's prestige due to her marriage with Saku. But when she was saved from one of her own weapons by Saku she realized that he is not bad and accepted him as her father. She is very innocent and has a pure personality. She has blonde hair like her mother. She first appears in Chapter 14. Her name means blue although in western terms unlike the others, which are all Japanese.
Mirin
 is Karin's mother. She has a happy-go-lucky nature. She seems to have a crush on Saku as well. She appears in Chapter 12.
Uran
Uran is Kuran's mother and Saku's aunt. She is expressionless like Hiiro. She seeks an heir for her family and is willing to sleep with Saku to have one, when Kuran proves to shy. It is revealed that she is pregnant due to some "fun" she had before she arrived, implying that she "sleeps" around often. She appears in Chapter 23.
Mobu
 is a classmate of Saku, Karin and Mebuki. She is naïve and dense. She can not keep secrets and when discovering something interesting will always need to share it to the world. She first appears in Chapter 20, where she may have developed a crush on Saku.
Laus
 is Saku's assistant in the future where he does not choose a wife and creates machines. However, an A.I. system he made destroyed the human race. She comes back to the past to help Saku make a choice for the future. She first appears at the end of Chapter 39.

2007 manga
Seinen manga
Shōnen manga
Comedy anime and manga
Harem anime and manga
Akita Shoten manga